Kravgi (trans. Κραυγή; Scream) is a studio album released by singer Anna Vissi οn November 23, 2000 in Greece and Cyprus, by Sony Music Greece. The album was also later released by Sony Music in Turkey in 2001 as well as in Australia and New Zealand in 2002.

The album was certified 7×Platinum in Greece, 7×Platinum Cyprus and Platinum in Turkey. It was the best-selling album of the year 2000 in Greece and in Cyprus. 
In Australia it charted within the top 75 of the official Australian charts and is the best selling album in the Greek language in the country.
Today the album stands as one of the most successful albums of all time in Greece with sales of over 175,000 copies (350,000 discs). Also is the biggest selling album of all times in Cyprus.
This album, along with English-language album Everything I Am released the same year, showcased a significant change over Vissi's stylistic and musical selections, expanding her image as a pop icon and contemporary artist as promoted in the mid-1990s and onwards.

Release

After the release of the album Antidoto, Vissi spent most of her time outside Greece for two years without making any appearances. On 15 July 2000, the maxi single "Agapi Ipervoliki" was released with 6 new tracks, which became 4× Platinum. Her first album after "Antidoto" was the English-language album Everything I Am, released on October 23, 2000. One month later, Kravgi was released which included 17 new tracks, as well as the 6 tracks from the maxi single "Agapi Ipervoliki", and a remix of an older release (the track "Kapnizo", from the album Fotia). It is the first double studio album by Vissi. The album broke all records in the charts of Greece after remaining in the 1st place of the album chart for 14 consecutive weeks, a record that has not been surpassed to date.

In 2019, the album was selected for inclusion in the Panik Gold box set The Legendary Recordings 1982–2019. The release came after Panik's acquisition rights of Vissi's back catalogue from her previous record company Sony Music Greece. This box set was printed on a limited edition of 500 copies containing CD releases of all of her albums from 1982 to 2019 plus unreleased material.

Track listing

International editions 
The album was also released in Turkey (as a follow up to the album Re!) and in Australia and New Zealand. In Australia and New Zealand the album kept its original track listing. In Turkey it was released as a 17-track album. It achieved Platinum status.

Turkish edition track listing:
 "Kravgi"
 "Kalitera Oi Dio Mas" (duet with Katy Garbi)
 "Horis To Moro Mou"
 "Sadismos"
 "Kardia Apo Petra"
 "Shizofreneia"
 "Apopse Leipeis Apo Do"
 "Agapoula Mou"
 "Den Me Agapas"
 "Atmosfaira Ilektrismeni"
 "To Poli Poli"
 "AAA (AAA) Kai Horisame"
 "To Teleftaio Tsigaro"
 "Kopike I Grammi"
 "Nostalgia"
 "Kaka Paidia"
 "Agapi Ipervoliki"

Music videos

"Agapi Ipervoliki"
"Agapi Ipervoliki" was released as an EP with five more songs, reaching 4×Platinum in Greece and Cyprus. The title song became the album's first video.

"Kravgi"
Just before the release of the complete album, the title song was released as a radio single with an accompanying video.

"Kalitera Oi Dio Mas" (Duet with Katy Garbi)
The next single following the album's release, accompanied by two versions of the video clip, part A and part B.

"Horis To Moro Mou"
The fourth video clip of the album was released in spring.

"Kravgi Hit Mix"
After the huge success of the album, with many radio singles peaking at the top 20 of the airplay charts, a Hit Mix video was released featuring most of the singles.

In 2001, all videos except for "Kalitera Oi Dio Mas" were selected for digital release on Vissi's The Video Collection.

Singles

The album was a huge success on the airplay in both Greece and Cyprus. Many songs managed to reach top position on the official airplay charts:
 Agapi Ipervoliki
 Den Me Agapas
 Kaka Paidia
 Ola Ta Lefta
 Kravgi
 Kalitera Oi Dio Mas
 Horis To Moro Mou
 Atmosfaira Ilektrismeni
 Schizofreneia
 AAA (AAA) Kai Horisame
 Moni Mou

Credits and Personnel

Personnel 
Arrangement: Manos Govatzidakis (tracks: 2-8), Nikos Karvelas (tracks: 1-4, 1-6, 1-7, 1-8, 1-10, 1-11, 1-12, 2-1, 2-4, 2-5, 2-6, 2-9, 2-10, 2-11, 2-12), Takis Magkafas (tracks: 1-1, 1-2), Nikos Terzis (tracks: 1-3, 1-5, 1-9, 2-2, 2-3, 2-7)

Backing vocals: Nikos Karvelas (tracks: 1-5, 2-3), Anna Vissi (tracks: 1-1, 1-2, 1-3, 1-5, 2-3, 2-10, 2-12)

Baglama: Giannis Lionakis (tracks: 1-7, 1-12, 2-1), Christos Olimpios (tracks: 2-5), Panagiotis Stergiou (tracks: 1-8, 2-2)

Bass: Telis Kafkas (tracks: 1-6, 1-7, 1-8, 1-9, 2-1, 2-4, 2-6), Panagiotis Moschovoudis (tracks: 1-10, 2-5, 2-9, 2-11)

Bouzouki: Giannis Lionakis (tracks: 1-7, 1-12, 2-1), Christos Olimpios (tracks: 2-5, 2-9)

Clarinet: Thanasis Vasilopoulos (tracks: 1-2, 1-4, 1-6, 1-9, 2-4, 2-6)

Cura: Giannis Lioankis (tracks: 1-6), Christos Olimpios (tracks: 2-11), Panagiotis Stergiou (tracks: 1-3, 1-8)

Cümbüş: Panagiotis Stergiou (tracks: 1-3, 2-7)

Cymbal: Nikos Karvelas (tracks: 2-1, 2-9)

Didgeridoo: Zeebadee (tracks: 1-10)

Drums: Nikos Karvelas (tracks: 1-12), Lakis Tsiatsiamis (tracks: 1-6, 1-7, 1-8, 1-9, 2-1, 2-4, 2-6), Peter Young (tracks: 1-10, 2-5, 2-9, 2-11)

Dulcimer: Nikos Karvelas (tracks: 2-9)

Guitars: Nikos Karvelas (tracks: 1-7, 2-1, 2-5, 2-9), Giannis Lionakis (tracks: 1-3, 1-6, 1-8, 1-9, 1-10, 1-12, 2-4, 2-5, 2-6, 2-9, 2-11), Christos Olimpios (tracks: 1-7, 2-1), Christos Tampouratzis (tracks: 2-3)

Keyboards: Nikos Karvelas (tracks: 1-1, 1-2, 2-10, 2-12), Kostas Miliotakis (tracks: 1-3, 1-4, 1-5, 1-6, 1-7, 1-8, 1-9, 1-10, 1-11, 1-12, 2-1, 2-2, 2-3, 2-4, 2-5, 2-6, 2-7, 2-9, 2-11)

Ney: Thanasis Vasilopoulos (tracks: 2-4)

Percussion: Giorgos Laskaris (tracks: 1-3, 1-9, 2-2), Mohament (tracks: 1-4, 1-8, 2-6)

Programming: Manos Govatzidakis (tracks: 1-4, 1-6, 1-7, 1-8, 1-11, 1-12, 2-1, 2-4, 2-6, 2-8), Takis Magkafas (tracks: 1-1, 1-2), Kostas Miliotakis (tracks: 1-10, 2-5, 2-9, 2-11), Martin Right (tracks: 2-10, 2-12), Nikos Terzis (1-3, 1-5, 1-9, 2-2, 2-3. 2-7)

Sazi: Vasilis Iliadis (tracks: 1-9, 2-2)

Second vocal: Anna Vissi (tracks: 1-11, 1-12, 2-1, 2-9)

Production 
Artwork: Panos Pitsilidis

Executive producer: Nikos Karvelas

Hair styling: Stefanos Vasilakis

Make up: Dimitris Dimitroulis

Mastering: Thodoris Chrisanthopoulos [Fabelsound]

Mix engineer: Rupert Coulson [Air studio] (tracks: 1-10, 2-5, 2-9, 2-11), Manos Govatzidakis [Echo studio] (tracks: 2-8), Christos Kosmas [Echo studio] (tracks: 1-4, 1-6, 1-7, 1-8, 1-11, 1-12, 2-1, 2-4, 2-6), Takis Magkafas [Echo studio] (tracks: 1-1, 1-2, 1-3, 1-5, 1-9, 2-2, 2-3, 2-7), Martin Right [Air studio] (tracks: 2-10, 2-12)

Mix engineer [Assistant]: Giannis Lionakis [Air studio] (tracks: 1-10, 2-5, 2-9, 2-11), Neale Ricotti [Air studio] (tracks: 1-10, 2-5. 2-9, 2-11)

Mood direction: Leonardo Orfanidis

Photo processing: Arsenis Miaris, Christos Simitas, Alexis Valoudros

Photographers: Alexis Kamitsos, Markos Melidis

Sound engineer: Rupert Coulson [Air studio] (tracks: 1-10, 2-5, 2-9, 2-11), Manos Govatzidakis [Echo studio] (1.1, 1.2, 1.3, 1.4, 1.5, 1.6, 1.7, 1.8, 1.9, 1.11, 1.12, 2.1, 2.2, 2.3, 2.4, 2.6, 2.7, 2.8), Ricky Graham [Air studio] (tracks: 1-10, 2-5, 2-9, 2-11), Christos Kosmas [Echo studio] (tracks: 1-1, 1-2, 1-3, 1-4, 1-5, 1-6, 1-7, 1-8, 1-9, 1-11, 1-12, 2-1, 2-2, 2-3, 2-4, 2-6, 2-7, 2-8), Martin Right [Air studio] (2.10, 2.12)

Sound engineer [Assistant]: Verona Antipa [Echo studio] (tracks: 1-1, 1-2, 1-3, 1-4, 1-5, 1-6, 1-7, 1-8, 1-9, 1-11, 1-12, 2-1, 2-2, 2-3, 2-4, 2-6, 2-7, 2-8

Spiritual styling: Levinia Konyalian

Charts

References

Anna Vissi albums
2000 albums
Greek-language albums
Albums produced by Nikos Karvelas
Sony Music Greece albums